Bukovče may refer to:

 Bukovče (Jagodina), a village in Serbia
 Bukovče (Negotin), a village in Serbia